Cenotaph is a Turkish death metal band from Ankara. They formed in 1993 and released their first demo, Life Immortal in 1995; since then, they have released seven full-length albums. The band has suffered numerous lineup changes since their inception, with vocalist Batu Çetin remaining the group's only consistent member.  They are signed to both Sevared Records (for US distribution) and Coyote Records (for European distribution).

Biography 

Cenotaph was formed in the summer of 1994 by singer Batu Çetin. After various changes in the band's line up, they released their first independent demo, Life Immortal, in 1995, with Batu Çetin (vocals), Coşkun Kaplan (guitar), Bülent İzgeç (bass), and Bülent Güngör (drums). The demo led to the band's playing shows and festivals in Ankara, Turkey.

In 1996, drummer Bülent Güngör was replaced by Goremaster, completing a line-up that did not change until 1999. With the new line-up, Cenotaph recorded their second demo-promo Promo '96 in 1996. In the summer of 1996, Cenotaph entered Yeşilkart Studios in İstanbul, to record their eight-song debut album Voluptuously Minced, and signed with local label Hammer Müzik. Voluptuously Minced was distributed in CD format by various labels in approximately 25 countries, and reached a wide range of listeners in Turkey in tape/CD format.

In 1998, the band recorded their second album, Puked Genital Purulency, at Stüdyo Forte in İstanbul. Puked Genital Purulency was released by Hammer Müzik in MC and CD format in 1999. After the album was released, bassist Bülent and guitarist Coşkun left the band due to personal reasons; Batu Çetin recruited Başar Çetin and Cihan Akün for Cenotaph.

With this new line-up Cenotaph performed at Ankara's Rockstation Festival in 2002. After the fest, the band began to work on new songs for the upcoming album and between January and March 2003, Cenotaph completed the recordings of their third album, Pseudo Verminal Cadaverium, at Zoo Sound Studios in Ankara. Mastering was done at the Mega Wimp Sound Studios in Germany. The album was released worldwide in the summer of 2003 by the American label United Guttural Records; release and distribution in Turkey was done by Batu Çetin's own label Drain Productions. For the promotion of the release, Cenotaph performed at Germany's extreme metal fest Fuck the Commerce in May 2005 and Ukraine's Metal Heads Mission festival in August 2007.

Ex-guitarist Coşkun, who had left the band back in 1999, rejoined the band in 2005 as the bass player. Subsequently, Dursun quit the band in 2005, and the band decided to continue with Semih—previously their session drummer for the shows abroad—as the new and full-time drummer. In 2006, the first two albums were gathered on one CD and re-released under the title of Voluptuously Puked Genitals by Burning Dogma Records from Texas. On May 27, 2006, the band performed at the fourth Maryland Deathfest in Baltimore, and in September 2007 released their fourth studio album, Reincarnation in Gorextasy. 

After the release of their fifth album Putrescent Infectious Rabidity in 2010, singer Batu Çetin began to focus on his side projects for the next several years. In June 2017, their long awaited sixth album Perverse Dehumanized Dysfunctions came out, and their seventh album Precognition to Eradicate  was released on October 13, 2021.

Line-up

Current members
 Batu Çetin − vocals (1993–present)
 Mattis Butcher − guitar (2019–present)
 Eren Pamuk – bass (2019–present)
 Mat Trak − drums (2022-present)

Former members
 Lille Gruber – (2010)
 Bülent Güngör − drums (1994–1996)
 Goremaster − drums (1996–2005)
 Semih Ornek (Barbar) − drums (2005–2006; 2009)
 Çağlar Yürüt – drums (2006-2009)
 Lille Gruber – drums (2009-2011)
 Bülent İzgeç − bass (1994–1999)
 Coşkun Kaplan – bass (2005-2008), guitar (1994 – 1999)
 Başar Çetin – guitar (1999–2008)
 Cenker Yılmaz – guitar (1999-2002)
 Cihan Akün – guitar (2002-2010)
 Serhat Kaya − guitar (2011–2013)
 Deniz Can Kurt – bass (2008-2010)
 Alper Çınar − bass (2011–2013)
 Burak Tavus – bass (2013-2015)
 Alican Erbaş – drums (2010-2018)
 Erkin Öztürk – guitar (2010-2019)
 Florent Duployer − drums (2019–2022)

Timeline

Discography

Albums
 Voluptously Minced (1996)
 Puked Genital Purulency (1999)
 Pseudo Verminal Cadaverium (2003)
 Reincarnation in Gorextasy (2007)
 Putrescent Infectious Rabidity (2010)
 Perverse Dehumanized Dysfunctions (2017)
 Precognition to Eradicate (2021)

Compilations
 Voluptously Puked Genitals (2005)
 Complete Demo's & Rehearsals '94-'96 (2011)
 Re-puked Purulency (2011)

DVD
 Guttural Sounds of Morbid Putrefaction (2011)

References

External links
 Official website
 Umatched Brutality Records site

Turkish death metal musical groups
Musical groups established in 1993
Musical groups from Ankara
1993 establishments in Turkey
Sevared Records artists